Dan Lader (born August 12, 1983, in Baltimore, Maryland) is an American soccer player.

Career

College
Lader grew up in Bel Air, Maryland and played college soccer at Salisbury University, where he was a 2004 All-American, the 2004 Conference Player of the Year, and was named to three All Conference teams, three Regional All-American teams, and helped take Salisbury to the 2004 NCAA Final Four.

Professional
Lader played for Maryland-based amateur team Baltimore Colts, with whom he won the 2005 USASA Open Cup, and later played in the USL Premier Development League as an over-age player for Virginia Legacy in 2007 before turning professional with Crystal Palace Baltimore in the USL Second Division in 2008.

Lader made his professional debut for Palace on April 25, 2008, as a substitute in his team's 3-0 opening day victory over the Pittsburgh Riverhounds, and scored his first professional goal in a 1–1 draw with the New England Revolution, the reigning Lamar Hunt US Open Cup champions, in the quarter-finals of that competition. On March 16, 2010, Baltimore announced the re-signing of Lader to a new contract for the 2010 season.

Career statistics
(correct as of 19 September 2010)

References

External links
 Crystal Palace Baltimore bio

1983 births
Living people
American soccer players
Legacy 76 players
Crystal Palace Baltimore players
Salisbury Sea Gulls athletes
USL League Two players
USL Second Division players
USSF Division 2 Professional League players
People from Bel Air, Maryland
Association football midfielders